John Elroy Sanford (December 9, 1922 – October 11, 1991), better known by his stage name Redd Foxx, was an American stand-up comedian and actor. Foxx gained success with his raunchy nightclub act before and during the civil rights movement. Known as the "King of the Party Records", he performed on more than 50 records in his lifetime.  He portrayed Fred G. Sanford on the television show Sanford and Son and starred in The Redd Foxx Show and The Royal Family. His film projects included All the Fine Young Cannibals (1960), Cotton Comes to Harlem (1970), Norman... Is That You? (1976) and Harlem Nights (1989).

In 2004, Foxx ranked 24th in Comedy Central Presents: 100 Greatest Stand-ups of All Time. Foxx not only influenced many comedians but was often portrayed in popular culture as well, mainly as a result of his catchphrases, body language and facial expressions exhibited on Sanford and Son. During the show's five-year run, Foxx won a Golden Globe Award and received an additional three nominations, along with three Primetime Emmy Award nominations. Foxx was posthumously given a star on the St. Louis Walk of Fame in 1992.

Early life
John Elroy Sanford was born on December 9, 1922, in St. Louis, Missouri, and raised in Chicago's South Side. His father, Fred “Freddie” Sanford, was from Hickman, Kentucky and served during World War I in the 823rd company of U.S. Transportation Corps. His father worked as an electrician and auto mechanic, but left his family sometime after 1930.  He was raised by his half-Seminole mother, Mary Hughes, from Ellisville, Mississippi, his grandmother and his minister. Foxx attended DuSable High School in Chicago's Bronzeville neighborhood with future Chicago mayor Harold Washington. Foxx had two older brothers, Fred Jr. who provided the name for his character on Sanford and Son and Leonard who died shortly after his birth in 1921. On July 27, 1939, Foxx performed on the Major Bowes Amateur Hour radio show as part of the Jump Swinging Six.

In the 1940s, he befriended Malcolm Little, later known as Malcolm X, a fellow dishwasher at Jimmy's Chicken Shack in Harlem. Both men had reddish hair, so Sanford was called "Chicago Red" after his hometown and Malcolm was known as "Detroit Red". In Malcolm's autobiography, Foxx is referred to as "the funniest dishwasher on this earth." During World War II, Foxx dodged the draft by eating half a bar of soap before his physical, a trick that resulted in heart palpitations. On September 30, 1946, Foxx recorded five songs for the Savoy label under the direction of Teddy Reig.

Career

Nightclub act
Foxx's raunchy nightclub act proved successful. After performing on the East Coast, his big break came after singer Dinah Washington insisted that he come to Los Angeles, where Dootsie Williams of Dootone records caught his act at the Brass Rail nightclub. Foxx was one of the first black comics to play to white audiences on the Las Vegas Strip. He was signed to a long-term contract and released a series of comedy albums on half a dozen record labels that quickly became cult favorites.

Sanford and Son
 
Foxx achieved his most widespread fame starring in the television sitcom Sanford and Son, an adaptation of the BBC series Steptoe and Son. Foxx played the role of Fred G. Sanford ("Fred Sanford" was actually Foxx's father's and brother's name), while co-star Demond Wilson played the role of his son Lamont. In this sitcom, Fred and Lamont were owners of a junk/salvage store in Watts, California, who dealt with many humorous situations. The series was notable for its racial humor and overt prejudices which helped redefine the genre of black situation comedy.

The series premiered on the NBC television network on January 14, 1972, and was broadcast for six seasons. In 1974, Foxx was sued for $10 million by Tandem Productions, producers of the show, for not showing up to start taping the new season. The final episode aired on March 25, 1977.

The show also had several running gags. When angry with Lamont, Fred would often say, "You big dummy!" or would often fake heart attacks by putting his hand on his chest and saying (usually while looking up at the sky), "It's the big one, I'm coming to join ya honey/Elizabeth" (referring to his late wife). Fred would also complain about having "arthur-itis" to get out of working by showing Lamont his cramped hand. Foxx portrayed a character who was in his 60s, although in real life he was a decade younger.

Foxx used his starring role on Sanford and Son to help get jobs for acquaintances such as LaWanda Page, Slappy White, Gregory Sierra, Don Bexley, Beah Richards, Stymie Beard, Leroy Daniels, Ernest Mayhand and Noriyuki "Pat" Morita.

Wilson was asked whether he kept in touch with everybody from Sanford & Son, especially the series' star himself, after the series was canceled: "No. I saw Redd Foxx once before he died, circa 1983, and I never saw him again. At the time I was playing tennis at the Malibu Racquet Club and I was approached by some producers about doing a Redd Foxx 50th Anniversary Special. I hadn’t spoken to him since 1977, and I called the club where (Redd) was playing. And we met at Redd’s office, but he was less than affable. I told those guys it was a bad idea. I never had a cross word with him. People say I’m protective of Redd Foxx in my book (Second Banana, Wilson’s memoir of the "Sanford" years). I had no animosity toward Foxx [for quitting the show in 1977] because I had a million-dollar contract at CBS to do Baby... I'm Back!. My hurt was that he didn't come to me about throwing the towel in—I found out in the hallway at NBC from a newscaster. I forgave him and I loved Redd, but I never forgot that. The love was there. You can watch any episode and see that."

Post-Sanford and Son

In 1977, Foxx left Sanford and Son after six seasons to star in a short-lived ABC variety show, resulting in the cancellation of the NBC series. In 1980 he was back playing Fred G. Sanford in a short-lived revival/spin-off, Sanford. In 1986, he returned to television in the ABC series The Redd Foxx Show, which was canceled after 12 episodes due to low ratings. Foxx appeared as an Obi-Wan Kenobi-like character in the Star Wars special of the Donny & Marie show. In an homage to his show, he mentioned the planet Sanford, which has no sun.

In 1989, Foxx was featured in the film Harlem Nights, written, directed, produced and starring Eddie Murphy.

Foxx made a comeback with the short-lived series The Royal Family, in which he co-starred with Della Reese.

At some point in the late 1970s and/or early 1980s, Foxx had a business on Sunset Boulevard in Hollywood where car owners could have their vehicles' roofs "velvetized"—a process that added a fuzzy, velvety texture to the brougham vinyl tops of some cars of that period, especially those that were referred to at the time as "pimp-mobiles." It was called "Redd Foxx’s Car Velvetizing."

Financial and tax problems 
According to People magazine, "Foxx reportedly once earned $4 million in a single year, but depleted his fortune with a lavish lifestyle, exacerbated by what he called 'very bad management.'" Contributing to his problems were his divorces. Foxx spent over $150,000 awaiting his divorce from his second wife Betty Jean which included monthly support payments of $10,000 following their separation in 1974. He also was ordered to pay $2,500 a month while awaiting divorce from third wife Joi after their separation in 1979, and then paid her a $300,000 divorce settlement in 1981.

In 1983, he filed for bankruptcy with proceedings continuing at least through 1989. The IRS filed tax liens against Redd Foxx's property for income taxes he owed for the years 1983 to 1986 totaling $755,166.21.  On November 28, 1989, the IRS seized his home in Las Vegas and seven vehicles (including a 1927 Model T, a 1975 Panther J72, a 1983 Zimmer, and a Vespa motor scooter) to pay the taxes which by then had grown to $996,630, including penalties and interest. Agents also seized "$12,769 in cash and a dozen guns, including a semiautomatic pistol," among some 300 items in total, reportedly leaving only Foxx's bed.
Foxx stated that the IRS "took my necklace and the ID bracelet off my wrist and the money out of my pocket ... I was treated like I wasn't human at all." It has been reported that at the time of his death in 1991 Foxx owed more than $3.6 million in taxes.

Personal life
Redd Foxx wed four times. His first marriage was to Evelyn Killebrew in 1948 and ended in divorce in 1951.

On July 5, 1956, Foxx married Betty Jean Harris, a showgirl and dancer, who was a colleague of LaWanda Page (later to be Foxx's TV rival Aunt Esther on Sanford and Son). They met at a nightclub where they were appearing on the same bill. As per their agreement, Harris gave up her career in show business to become a full-time housewife. Foxx adopted Harris's nine-year-old daughter Debraca, who assumed the surname "Foxx." Harris handled most of Foxx's business ventures such as Redd Foxx Enterprises, which included a chain of record stores in Los Angeles. The couple separated in 1974 due to Foxx's infidelity. After 18 years of marriage, Foxx filed for divorce on the grounds of incompatibility in May 1974. He also obtained a restraining order that prevented Harris from "removing, hiding or secreting property" from their home in Las Vegas, and she had to return $110,000 that was removed from bank accounts. Foxx was absent from Debraca's wedding in 1975.

Foxx married his third wife Joi Yun Chi Chung at the Thunderbird Hotel in Las Vegas on December 31, 1976. Foxx met Joi, who was 20 years his junior, when she was a cocktail waitress at the Las Vegas Hilton, shortly after her arrival from Korea. After Foxx filed for divorce in October 1979, she responded with her own divorce suit charging him with cruelty. During their divorce proceedings, Foxx told Jet magazine: "I've been married three times and I'm out." He added: "I'd rather have kids because when I give up all this money on divorce, it should go to the children and not some guy." Their divorce was finalized in 1981; Foxx paid a $300,000 divorce settlement.

In July 1991, Foxx wed Kaho Cho from Seoul, South Korea. They met at Bally's Hotel and Casino in Las Vegas. Despite denouncing marriage after his third divorce, Foxx told Jet magazine that he married Cho because she stuck by him through his trials and tribulations with the IRS. "She saw me with a nickel. And hopefully, she will see me with a dollar. I'll give her seventy-five cents of it," he said. They were married at Little Church of the West in Las Vegas followed by a reception at the Hacienda Hotel.

Death
On October 11, 1991, during a break from rehearsals for The Royal Family, Foxx suffered a heart attack on the set. According to Della Reese, Foxx was chatting with a reporter from Entertainment Tonight. The scene he was supposed to be in was not ready to shoot and Foxx and Reese were practicing. In fact, Foxx had no lines in the scene at all; as Reese said, all he had to do was "walk behind the back of my chair".

While Foxx was giving the interview, one of the producers entered the stage and asked where he was. Reese told him, and the producer responded by grabbing Foxx and taking him into the set, saying: "If he's supposed to be in the scene he should be here." Reese said that this was another in the long line of disputes Foxx had with the producers, including an instance where one claimed he could "teach [Foxx] to be funny."

Foxx, irate, did his scripted pass. However, he fell to the floor immediately after doing so. Reese said that nobody initially suspected anything was wrong. Foxx, after all, was famous for having Fred Sanford fake heart attacks on Sanford and Son and was particularly skilled at pratfalls. Reese went to the floor when Foxx did not immediately rise and heard him say "get my wife" twice. Reese called for paramedics, who initially pronounced Foxx dead at the scene. According to Joshua Rich at Entertainment Weekly: "It was an end so ironic that for a brief moment castmates figured Foxx–whose 1970s TV character often faked coronaries–was kidding when he grabbed a chair and fell to the floor."

Foxx was temporarily resuscitated and taken to Queen of Angels Hollywood Presbyterian Medical Center. Four and a half hours after admission, he again was pronounced dead.  Foxx is buried at Palm Memorial Park (also known as Palm Eastern Cemetery) in Las Vegas.  Foxx's mother Mary Sanford Carson (1903–1993) outlived her son by two years. She had been lingering in and out of a coma for a few years before her death in 1993. She is buried beside him.

Influence
Comedian and actor Richard Pryor cited Redd Foxx as an influence. "He gave me inspiration and encouragement so I could be more me," Pryor told Ebony magazine in 1990. Comedian Chris Rock also cites Redd Foxx as an influence. An episode of his show Everybody Hates Chris shows young Chris Rock overhearing his parents' Redd Foxx albums and getting started doing stand-up by retelling the jokes at school. Actor and comedian Jamie Foxx has stated that he chose his professional surname as a tribute to Foxx. Pat Morita also named Foxx as his mentor from his early days as a nightclub comedian.

Eddie Murphy has said that Redd Foxx is the most naturally funny person that he's encountered on Jimmy Kimmel Live

Portrayals in popular media
In 1990, in the pilot episode of In Living Color, in reference to Foxx's financial troubles, Foxx was portrayed by Damon Wayans, who is making a public service announcement to encourage people to pay their taxes.

In the 1992 Seinfeld episode The Opera, Jerry chastises George for swearing during a wedding speech, saying "You were like a Redd Foxx record."

In the 1996 music video for "I Ain't Mad At Cha" by 2Pac featuring Danny Boy, look-alikes of many deceased entertainers are revealed to be playing featuring (among others), Redd Foxx, Jimi Hendrix, Bob Marley, Nat King Cole, Miles Davis, Marvin Gaye, Billie Holiday, Florence Ballard, Sammy Davis Jr., and Louis Armstrong.

In the film Why Do Fools Fall in Love, Foxx is portrayed by Aries Spears. He is shown performing a stand-up comedy routine.

In 2007, in the animated television series Family Guy episode "Blue Harvest," a parody of the 1977 film Star Wars: Episode IV - A New Hope, Redd Foxx appears very briefly as an X-wing pilot. When his ship is shot down he cries, "I'm coming Elizabeth!," before dying. In addition to this, he has been parodied on Family Guy by Francis Griffin acting as Foxx's Sanford and Son character.

Foxx was meant to be featured in the MTV show Celebrity Deathmatch, advertised as taking on Jamie Foxx in the episode "When Animals Attack." Instead of Redd Foxx, however, Jamie Foxx fought Ray Charles.  Krusty the Klown reportedly, in an early episode of The Simpsons had a heart attack on the air, in the same vein as Fred Sanford; oddly, the episode predates Foxx's death, which in fact was the result of heart failure.

In the Boondocks episode "Stinkmeaner 3: The Hateocracy" he is portrayed as Lord Rufus Crabmiser, one of Stinkmeaner's old friends coming to kill the Freeman family. Childhood friend and Sanford & Son co-star Lawanda Page is also portrayed in the same episode as Lady Esmeralda Gripenasty.

Redd Foxx appears as a minor character in the 2009 James Ellroy novel Blood's a Rover. He gives a bawdy eulogy at the wake of Scotty Bennett, a murdered rogue LAPD detective, including the line: "Scotty Bennett was fucking a porcupine. I gots to tell you motherfuckers that it was a female porcupine, so I don't see nothing perverted in it."

In the 1999 film Foolish starring comedian Eddie Griffin and rapper Master P, the ghost of Redd Foxx gives Griffin's character advice from behind a stall door in a men's restroom at a comedy club before he goes onstage to perform a show.

In 2015, it was said that comedian Tracy Morgan would portray Redd Foxx in a Richard Pryor biopic starring opposite comedian Mike Epps.

Filmography
All the Fine Young Cannibals (1960) as Redd, Piano Player at Rose's (uncredited)
Cotton Comes to Harlem (1970) as Uncle Budd / Booker Washington Sims
Norman... Is That You? (1976) as Ben Chambers
Days of Heaven (1978) as Himself / Special Thanks
Harlem Nights (1989) as Bennie Wilson
Surely, You Jest (2019) as Himself (Posthumously - archive footage)
Dolemite Is My Name (2019) as Performer ("On the Loose") (Posthumously - archive footage)

TV shows
Sanford and Son (1972–77) as Fred G. Sanford 
The Dean Martin Celebrity Roast(1974) as Himself
The Captain & Tennille Show (one episode) (1976) as Himself
The Redd Foxx Comedy Hour (1977–78) as Himself
HBO On Location with Redd Foxx (1978) as Himself
Sanford (1980–81) as Fred G. Sanford
Redd Foxx: Video in a Plain Brown Wrapper (1983) as Himself
Amos 'n' Andy: Anatomy of a Controversy (TV movie) (1983) as Himself / Special Thanks
Viva Shaf Vegas (1986) as Himself
The Redd Foxx Show (1986) as Al Hughes
Motown Merry Christmas (1987) as Himself / Various Skits
Ghost of a Chance (1987) as Ivory Clay
The Royal Family (1991) as Alfonso Royal
Biography - Redd Foxx: Say It Like It Is(January 11, 2000) as Himself (Posthumously - archive footage)
E! True Hollywood Story: Redd Foxx (2001) as Himself (Posthumously - archive footage)
Laugh Mobb Present - Episodes 3 & 4 (2012) as Himself / Special Thanks (Posthumously - archive footage)
Unsung Hollywood - Redd Foxx (2015) as Himself (Posthumously - archive footage)
History of Comedy (TV Series - Season 1, Episode 1) (2017) as Himself (Posthumously - archive footage)
Marvelous Mrs. Maisel (TV series - Season 1, Episode 4; Season 2, Episode 3) (2017–2018) as Himself/Writer (Posthumously - archive footage)

Discography

Savoy Records discography

78 Singles
630A – Let's Wiggle a Little Woogie
630B – Lucky Guy
631A – Fine Jelly Blues
631B – Redd Foxx Blues
645B – Shame on You

Dooto/Dootone Records discography

Albums
DTL01 – The Best Laff
DTL214 – Laff Of The Party Vol. 1 (1956)
DTL219 – Laff Of The Party Vol. 2
DTL220 – Laff Of The Party Vol. 3
DTL227 – Laff Of The Party Vol. 4 (1956)
DTL234 – Best Of Foxx Vol. 1
DTL236 – Laff Of The Party Vol.7
DTL249 – Burlesque Humor
DTL253 – The Side Splitter Vol.1 (1959)
DTL265 – The Laff of the Party Vol. 8 (1957)
DTL270 – The Side Splitter Vol. 2 (1959)
DTL274 – Best of Fun (Red Foxx and Others)
DTL275 – Racy Tales (Also released as The New Race Track) (1959)
DTL290 – Redd Foxx Funn
DTL295 – Sly Sex (1960)
DTL298 – Have One On Me (1960)
DTL801 – Laffarama (1961)
DTL804 – Wild Party (1961)
DTL809 – This is Foxx
DTL815 – He's Funny That Way (1964)
DTL820 – Red Foxx at Jazzville U.S. (1961)
DTL830 – The New Fugg (1962)
DTL828 – Hearty Party Laffs (1962)
DTL832 – Laff Along With Foxx (1962) (compilation)
DTL834 – Crack Up (1963)
DTL835 – Funny Stuff (1963)
DTL840 – Adults Only (1967)
DTL845 – Jokes I Can't Tell On Television (1969)
DTL846 – Shed House Humor (1969)
DTL853 – Sanford & Foxx (1972)
DTL854 – Foxx and Jazz
DTL858 – Dirty Redd (1973)
DTL860 – Funky Tales From a Dirty Old Junkman (1972)

Singles
DTL385 – The New Soap/Song Plugging
DTL390 – The Jackasses/The Race Track
DTL397 – The Honeymooners/The Sneezes
DTL402 – Beans And Pineapple Sauce/The Army
DTL408 – The Two Oars/The Preacher's Bicycle
DTl411 – The Dead Jackass/Women Over Forty
DTL416 – Real Pretty Baby/It's Fun To Be Living In The Crazy House
DTL418 – Best Of Redd Foxx Parts 1&2
DTL421 – The House/Sex And Orange Juice
DTL426 – Hollywood Playboy/The Dogs Meeting
DTL436 – South Of The Border/The Plastic Surgeon
DTL453 – The Dear John Letter/Honesty Is The Best Policy
DTL455 – The Shoe Shine Boy/The Royal Thighs And Others
DTL458 – 118 Ways To Make Love/Pregnancy Co-Operation
DTL460 – No Teeth/With My Teeth/The Best Years/Deep Sea Diver
DTL464 – Christmas Hard Ties/Jaw Resting

Atlantic Records discography
SD 18157 – You Gotta Wash Your Ass (1975)

Loose Cannon Records discography 

314-528 061-2 – Uncensored (1995)

Gusto Records discography
KSD-1072 – Bare Facts

King Records discography
KSD-1073 – Pass the Apple Eve
KSD-1074 – In a Nutshell
KS-1135 – Matinee Idol
SK-754 – X-Rated v. 4
SK-756 – X-Rated v. 6

Laff Records discography
A170 – Pryor Goes Foxx Hunting (split LP including one half of Richard Pryor's "Craps")
A203 – I Ain't Lied Yet

Loma Records discography
5901 – Both Sides of Redd Foxx (1966 – Loma/Warner/Rino)
5905 – On the Loose
5906 – Redd Foxx "live" : Las Vegas! (1968)
5908 – Foxx-A-Delic (1968)

MF Records discography 
RF1 – Laff Your Head off
RF2 – Laff Your Ass Off
RF3 – Redd Foxx At Home
RF4 – A Whole Lot of Soul
RF5 – At His Best
RF6 – Doin' His Own Thing
RF7 – Say It Like It Is
RF8 – Is Sex Here To Stay
RF9 – Where It's At
RF10 – Huffin' And A Puffin'''RF11 – I Am Curious, BlackRF12 – Three Or Four Times A DayRF13 – Mr. Hot PantsRF14 – Hot FlashesRF15 – RestrictedRF16 – SuperstarRF17 – Spice can Be Nice!RF18 – Strictly For AdultsRF19 – Vegas we ComeRF20 – Elizabeth, I'm Coming!RF21 – Redd 75 Master Classics Records discography 

AlbumsGettin' Down N' Dirty (2008)

 Comedy Classics discography 

AlbumsThe Ultimate Comedy Collection'' (2011)

References

External links

Image of Redd Foxx and his wife, 1973. Los Angeles Times Photographic Archive (Collection 1429). UCLA Library Special Collections, Charles E. Young Research Library, University of California, Los Angeles.

1922 births
1991 deaths
Male actors from Chicago
20th-century American comedians
African-American male actors
African-American stand-up comedians
American stand-up comedians
American male television actors
American male film actors
African-American television producers
Television producers from California
American people of Seminole descent
Best Musical or Comedy Actor Golden Globe (television) winners
Deaths onstage
Male actors from St. Louis
Male actors from Los Angeles
Nightclub performers
20th-century American male actors
Comedians from Missouri
Comedians from California
Comedians from Illinois
Draft evaders
Television producers from Illinois
Film producers from California
Film producers from Illinois
Las Vegas shows
Loma Records artists
Savoy Records artists
Atlantic Records artists
King Records artists
Black Seminole people
20th-century African-American people
United Service Organizations entertainers